Bonny Pierce Lhotka (born 1942) is a painter and mixed-media artist, and tradigital art.

Life
She was born in La Grange, Illinois on 14 July 1942. She attended Bradley University and graduated with a Bachelors in Fine Art in 1964.

She has shown her work in numerous shows and exhibitions, including the 2011 Digital Darkroom group show at the Annenberg Space for Photography that was the focus of a 2015 KCET documentary.

She has written a number of instructional books.

Works

Karin Schminke, Dorothy Simpson Krause, Bonny Pierce Lhotka, Digital Art Studio: Techniques for Combining Inkjet Printing with Traditional Art Materials Watson-Guptill Publications, 2004,

References

American women painters
Living people
1942 births
21st-century American painters
20th-century American painters
American multimedia artists
People from La Grange, Illinois
Painters from Illinois
Bradley University alumni
20th-century American women artists
21st-century American women artists